Nathan D. Reitz is a former Democratic member of the Illinois House of Representatives from the 116th district.
The 116th, located in Southern Illinois, includes all or portions of Monroe, Perry, Randolph, and St. Clair counties. Reitz was appointed to office after Jerry Costello II was appointed by J. B. Pritzker to be director of law enforcement for the Illinois Department of Natural Resources. Nathan Reitz, the son of former Representative Dan Reitz, previously served as an alderman in Steeleville, Illinois.

In the 2020 general election, Reitz lost to Republican candidate David Friess by a large margin.

References

External links
 Profile at Illinois General Assembly official website

Living people
People from Randolph County, Illinois
Democratic Party members of the Illinois House of Representatives
Illinois city council members
1976 births
21st-century American politicians